Warunee Sangsirinavin nicknamed Pia (born July 22, 1952, in Bangkok, Thailand) is Miss Thailand 1969. She is the daughter of Chun and Surang Sangsirinavin. She competed in the Miss Universe 1971 pageant competition held in the United States.

She is married to Treetip Telan, and currently she works in the weaving business.

References 

1949 births
Living people
Warunee Sangsirinavin
Miss Universe 1971 contestants
Warunee Sangsirinavin